Conus carioca is a species of sea snail, a marine gastropod mollusk in the family Conidae, the cone snails, cone shells or cones.

These snails are predatory and venomous. They are capable of "stinging" humans.

Description
The size of the shell varies between 36 mm and 57 mm.

Distribution
This marine species occurs in the Atlantic Ocean off Eastern Brasil.

References

  Edward J. Petuch, New South American Gastropods in the Genera Conus (Conidae) and Latirus; Proceedings of the Biological Society of Washington v. 99 (1986)
 Petuch E. (2013) Biogeography and biodiversity of western Atlantic mollusks. CRC Press. 252 pp
 Puillandre N., Duda T.F., Meyer C., Olivera B.M. & Bouchet P. (2015). One, four or 100 genera? A new classification of the cone snails. Journal of Molluscan Studies. 81: 1-23

External links
 To World Register of Marine Species
 Cone Shells - Knights of the Sea
 Gastropods.com: Sandericonus sanderi var. carioca

carioca
Gastropods described in 1986